Kemistry & Storm were an English drum and bass DJ and recording duo, composed of Kemistry (Valerie Olukemi A "Kemi" Olusanya) and Storm (Jayne Conneely). They were active in the 1990s. Along with Goldie, they founded the Metalheadz label in 1994.

Appearing mainly on the club scene, recordings by the act include the mix album DJ-Kicks: Kemistry & Storm (1999). They were recognized for being "some of the first women DJs to have a widely distributed album" in a "male-dominated genre of music".

Olusanya died in April 1999.

History
Both Kemistry and Storm grew up in Kettering, where they met and became friends. They kept in touch as their lives diverged over the coming years, working as a make-up artist and in radiography respectively, and gave up their careers to begin DJing when both found themselves living in London in the early 1990s. They first started out on London pirate radio stations Touchdown and Defection FM.

Along with Goldie, whom Kemistry had introduced to the drum and bass scene in the early years of the decade, they founded the Metalheadz record label in 1994. With Goldie, they led Metalheadz for two-and-a-half years before leaving the label. The success of their DJ-Kicks album brought them opportunities to DJ internationally and has been described as "paving the way for other, younger, female DJs".

The duo's collaboration came to an end with the death of Kemistry in a traffic accident in the early morning of 25 April 1999, while returning from a Kemistry & Storm gig in Southampton. Jayne Conneely continued performing as DJ Storm.

References

External links

British drum and bass music groups
English electronic music duos
Drum and bass duos
Female musical duos
Club DJs